Local elections were held in Cebu City on May 14, 2007 within the Philippine general election. Registered voters of the city elected candidates for the following elective local posts: mayor, vice mayor, district representative, and eight councilors at-large for each district. There are two legislative districts in the city.

Mayoralty and vice mayoralty elections

Mayor

Vice mayor

District representatives

1st District

2nd District

References

2007 Philippine local elections
Elections in Cebu City